Donald J. Salls (June 24, 1919 – January 2, 2021) was an American college football player and coach. He served as the head football coach at Jacksonville State University from 1946 to 1952 and from 1954 to 1964. He was a World War II veteran and a Purple Heart recipient. He died in January 2021 at the age of 101.

Head coaching record

References

1919 births
2021 deaths
American centenarians
American football fullbacks
American football linebackers
Alabama Crimson Tide football players
Jacksonville State Gamecocks football coaches
United States Army officers
United States Army personnel of World War II
Coaches of American football from New Jersey
Players of American football from Trenton, New Jersey
Military personnel from New Jersey
Men centenarians